Events from the year 1645 in France

Incumbents
 Monarch – Louis XIV
Regent: Anne of Austria

Events
Charenton established
Francois Morneau married Marie Mornet - 1645

Births

16 August – Jean de La Bruyère, writer (died 1696)
663 Marie Bernard (died 1718)

Full date missing
François Vachon de Belmont (died 1732)
François de Troy, painter and engraver (died 1730)
Jean-Baptiste Théodon, sculptor (died 1713)
Robert Clicquot, organ builder (died 1719)
Charles Louis Simonneau, engraver (died 1728)
Daniel Montbars, buccaneer (died 1707?)

Deaths

Full date missing
Jacques Linard, painter (born 1597)
François de La Rochefoucauld, cardinal (born 1558)

See also

References

1640s in France